Armando Ribeiro Falcão (November 11, 1919 – February 10, 2010) was a Brazilian politician.
Falcão was born in Fortaleza. He graduated from Federal University Of Rio de Janeiro Faculty Of Law. From 1974 to 1979, he served as Brazil's Justice Minister under former President Ernesto Geisel.

Falcão died from pneumonia in Rio de Janeiro on February 10, 2010, at the age of 90.

References

1919 births
2010 deaths
People from Fortaleza
Deaths from pneumonia in Rio de Janeiro (state)
Health ministers of Brazil
Ministers of Justice of Brazil